The following is a list of neighborhoods in Paterson, New Jersey, United States.
Lower Eastside
Near Eastside
Unity Square Park
Totowa Section
Union Avenue 
Hillcrest 
Old Great Falls Historic District 
Stoney Road
South Paterson 
Lakeview
Manor Section
Eastside Park Historic District
Sandy Hill
People's Park
21st Avenue
Riverside 
Bunker Hill
Downtown 
The Central Business District
Old Dublin District
Little Italy
Little Lima
Wrigley Park
Northside

neighborhoods